Board of Airport Commissioners of Los Angeles v. Jews for Jesus, Inc., 482 U.S. 569 (1987), was a case in which the United States Supreme Court held that an ordinance prohibiting all "First Amendment activities" in the Los Angeles International Airport was facially unconstitutional due to its overbreadth.

The unanimous opinion of the Court was written by Justice O'Connor. O'Connor wrote that the ordinance "reaches the universe of expressive activity, and, by prohibiting all protected expression, purports to create a virtual 'First Amendment Free Zone' at LAX". The Airport Commissioners argued that the ordinance would only be applied against activities that were related to the airport, but O'Connor pointed out that "wearing of a T-shirt or button that contains a political message" would still fall within the prohibition.

In a brief concurrence, Justice White expressed his concern that the decision did not address the question of whether the airport constituted a public forum.

References

External links 
 

United States Supreme Court cases
United States Supreme Court cases of the Rehnquist Court
United States Free Speech Clause case law
1987 in United States case law
Los Angeles International Airport